Olga Stringfellow (born 4 June 1923) was a New Zealand journalist and author of romantic and historical fiction.

History
Stringfellow was born in Dunedin as Olga Elsa Brown on 4 June 1923.  She was educated at the Otago Girls' High School in Dunedin, and the Elam School of Fine Arts.

In 1943, she was married (later divorced) and moved to the United Kingdom in 1949. After a time in journalism, with the Modern Woman and The Sketch, and as a columnist for the Scottish Daily Express, she became an author.  Her published works include the historical novels Mary Bravender (1960), set at the time of the New Zealand Wars, and A Gift for the Sultan (1962), based on the true account of a Scottish woman captured by pirates, sold into slavery, and eventually becoming a wife of the Sultan of Morocco.

Stringfellow was a recognised touch healer.  She counted Middle Eastern princes and New York millionaires amongst her patients.

During the 1970s, she lived returned to New Zealand, living on Auckland's North Shore.

In later years Stringfellow lived at Hartley Wintney, near Basingstoke, Hampshire.

Her brother Peter Brown was the leading New Zealand landscape artist.

Written material

Books out of print
 Olga Stringfellow, Mary Bravender (1960)
 Olga Stringfellow, A Gift for the Sultan (1962)

References

answers.com
 The Free Library

Year of death missing
New Zealand women novelists
New Zealand romantic fiction writers
1923 births
People educated at Otago Girls' High School
20th-century New Zealand novelists
Women romantic fiction writers
20th-century New Zealand women writers